UnRAR is the name of two different command-line applications for extracting RAR file archives.

RARLAB UnRAR
This source-available freeware is a Windows command-line version of UnRAR, created by RARlab, the same company that created the commercial WinRAR software.  This software can extract newer RAR v5.0 file archives that are not supported by competitors.

The source-available license stipulates that users may not use the unrar code to create an rar compressor.

GNU UnRAR
This free software is a Linux version of UnRAR that is based on an old version of RARLAB's UnRAR with permission from author Eugene Roshal. It is licensed under the GPL. Work ended in 2007. It does not support the RAR3 format.

See also
 Comparison of file archivers
 Comparison of archive formats
 List of archive formats
 RAR (file format)#Third-party software for extracting RAR files

References

External links
 RARLAB UnRAR
 GNU UnRAR

Free data compression software
File archivers